Benjamin James may refer to:

 Benjamin F. James (1885–1961), Republican member of the U.S. House of Representatives from Pennsylvania
 Benjamin James (American football) (1912–2015), head football coach for the Dickinson College Red Devils, 1942
 Benjamin James (Nova Scotia politician), farmer and political figure in Nova Scotia
 B. O. James (Benjamin Oliver James, 1883–1956), American politician in Virginia